The North Gate of Xiong Town or Syongjhen North Gate is a historical gate in Gushan District, Kaohsiung, Taiwan.

History
The area was built in 1875 by the Chinese military of Qing dynasty as a fort to protect the Takao Harbor.  It was built during the same time as the construction of Qihou Fort. However, In 1895, first Sino-Japanese war broke out, the fort fought with Japanese navy and was lost to the Japanese, during Japanese occupation the canons have since been removed, with only arc-shaped gun mounts remaining.

After 1945, Republic of China took control of Taiwan as well as this fort, it served as barracks and ship signal controller. In 1985, government agents moved out of this area, it was appointed by the Kaoshiung government as grade 3 heritage. In 1992, it was opened to public as a historical tourism spot. In 2022, the damaged buildings were repaired by the Kaochiung cultural department and re-opened to the public.

Transportation
The gate is accessible within walking distance west of Sizihwan Station of Kaohsiung MRT.

See also
 List of tourist attractions in Taiwan
 Qihou Fort
 History of Kaohsiung

References

1875 establishments in Taiwan
Gates in Kaohsiung
Gushan District